Sierra Nevada (meaning "mountain range covered in snow") is a mountain range in the Andalusian province of Granada in Spain.

It is a popular tourist destination, as its high peaks make skiing possible in one of Europe's most southerly ski resorts, in an area along the Mediterranean Sea predominantly known for its warm temperatures and abundant sunshine. At its foothills is found the city of Granada, and a little further south, Almería and Málaga.

Parts of the range have been included in the Sierra Nevada National Park. The range has also been declared a biosphere reserve.

Formation
The Sierra Nevada was formed during the Alpine Orogeny, a mountain-building event that also formed the European Alps to the east and the Atlas Mountains of northern Africa across the Mediterranean Sea to the south. The Sierra as observed today formed during the Paleogene and Neogene Periods (66 to 1.8 million years ago) from the collision of the African and Eurasian continental plates.

Geography

Central to the mountain range is a ridge running broadly west-south-west - east-north-east. For a substantial distance, the watershed stays consistently above . This is sufficient altitude for the peaks to be consistently snow-covered.

On the southern side of the range, several long, narrow river valleys lead off towards the south-west, separated by a number of subsidiary ridges.
On the steeper and craggier northern side, the valleys have less regular orientations. This side is dominated by the Rio Genil which starts near Mulhacén and into which many of the other rivers flow.

Geologically, the range is composed chiefly of soft micaceous schists, sloping steeply to the north, but more gradually to the south and south-east.

Highest peaks

Climate 
According to the Köppen climate classification, Sierra Nevada has a Mediterranean climate, with different variations depending on the altitude. Above  the climate is Mediterranean subalpine (Dsc), due to the location's high elevation and low summer precipitation. At an elevation slightly lower than that classification area; where February means average above ; it falls into the normal cool-summer mediterranean classification transitioning with the hot-summer variety in surrounding lowland areas. This renders Sierra Nevada's climate a highland cooled-down variety of a typical mediterranean climate. Summer and winter daytime temperatures are some 12° C cooler than found in Granada, differences that are even greater in spring as Sierra Nevada takes longer to approach the short summers.

Sport
 Sierra Nevada Ski Station

Gallery

See also 
 Alpujarras
 Baetic System
 Sierra Nevada National Park

Notes

References

Bibliography
 Francisco Pérez Raya, Joaquín Molero Mesa, Francisco Valle Tendero, 1992: "Parque Natural de Sierra Nevada. Paisaje, fauna, flora, itinerarios". Ed. Rueda. Madrid.  (Spanish)
 "Flora de la Tundra de Sierra Nevada". Pablo Prieto Fernández, Ed. Universidad de Granada.  (Spanish)
 "Sierra Nevada: Guía de Montaña". Aurelio del Castillo y Antonio del Castillo. Ed. Penibética, 2003.  (Spanish)

Further reading

External links 

 Google Maps - Satellite Photo
  Sierra Nevada Ski Resort - official site
 Sierra Nevada ski resort - trail map
 Maps of the Sierra Nevada
 nevasport.com - XVII sport week - Old Pictures
 Natural Park Sierra Nevada
 Sulayr

 
Nevada
Geography of the Province of Granada
Geography of the Province of Almería
Penibaetic System
Biosphere reserves of Spain